Thari Mirwah, or Thari, is the capital city of Mirwah Subdivision (Mirwah taluka) in Khairpur District, Sindh, Pakistan. Thari weather is hetregenous (diverse) average temperature recorded is 14 - 40 c in winter and summer. Weather conditions allows growing many cereals and vegetable crops.

Education
Government educational institutes includes a Boys High School, a Girls High School, Degree college, Government IT Centre under supervision of IBA-IET and a Mono-Technic & Vocasional college in Thari Mirwah.

Roads & Infrastructure 

As in other parts of Sindh, the condition of roads in Thari Mirwah is horrendous. However, the rehabilitation of the Thari-Setharja road is underway, and some construction has already been completed. On the eastern side of Thari is a desert known as Nara desert. A single road runs from Dhedano village to the Sawan gas field(Taluka Nara Distt Khairpur), where it turns into the  gas company's blacktop highroad.

The newly constructed Mehran Highway is the only highway to connect Nawabshah District to Khairpur.  The highway passes through the jurisdictions of Thari Mirwah, Faiz Ganj, Bandhi, and Daur.  Construction lasted seven years. Many accidents have occurred on the completed highway, which is being used by illegal buses and coaches going to Punjab and Khyber Pakhtunkhwa, Fata.

On 24 August 2014, a coach coming from Punjab collided at Kot lalu with a van from Thari city which was traveling from Karachi to Thari Mirwah; 10 passengers were killed and 11 injured. All were natives of Thari Mirwah.

Lakes of Dubbi village
 Dubbi village is about 10 Kilometer distance from Thari city and 63 kilometer from Khairpur city. There are following seven beautiful lakes located at Village Dubbi near Thari Mirwah:

 Bakri Waro
 Khuth Sim
 Wadi Sim
 Jamal Shah
 Tal
 Wairo
 Ganairo

References

Populated places in Khairpur District
Talukas of Sindh
Thari Mirwah